St Peter's High School may refer to:

 St Peter's High School, Burnham-on-Crouch
 St Peter's High School, Gloucester
 St Peter's High School, Mandalay 
 St. Peter's High School (Mansfield, Ohio)
 St. Peter's Boys High School, New York
 St. Peter's High School for Girls, New York
 St. Peter's High School, Pakistan

See also
 St. Peter Catholic High School, Ottawa